The Henry M. Hinsdill House, at 662 Norfolk St. in Park City, Utah, was probably built around 1893.  It was listed on the National Register of Historic Places in 1984.

It is a one-story variant of a hall and parlor plan house, with a gable roof. Unlike the typically symmetric facade of a hall and parlor house, this has two windows on one side of the front door and one on the other, with the latter set at an angle in the northwest corner of the house.  A porch across the front wraps around this corner.  Original porch balustrade and piers have been replaced.

References

National Register of Historic Places in Summit County, Utah
Houses completed in 1893